A wireless keyboard is a computer keyboard that allows the user to communicate with computers, tablets, or laptops with the help of radio frequency (RF), such as WiFi  and Bluetooth or with infrared (IR) technology. It is common for wireless keyboards available these days to be accompanied by a wireless mouse.

Wireless keyboards based on infrared technology use light waves to transmit signals to other infrared-enabled devices. But, in case of radio frequency technology, a wireless keyboard communicates using signals which range from 27 MHz to up to 2.4 GHz. Most wireless keyboards today work on 2.4 GHz radio frequency. Bluetooth is another technology that is being widely used by wireless keyboards. These devices connect and communicate to their parent device via the bluetooth protocol.

A wireless keyboard can be connected using RF technology with the help of two parts, a transmitter and a receiver. The radio transmitter is inside the wireless keyboard. The radio receiver plugs into a keyboard port or USB port. Once the receiver and transmitter are plugged in, the computer recognizes the keyboard and mouse as if they were connected via a cable.

Types

Standard size wireless keyboard: These keyboards are standard size wireless keyboard.
Foldable - hinges allow for folding of keyboard
Portable keyboard with touchpad: Keyboard comes with integrated touch pad.
  Portable with Stand - comes with tablet/smartphone stand 
Roll-up wireless keyboard: wireless keyboard that can be rolled up when not in use.
Mini Wireless Keyboard: Palm sized keyboard with an integrated touch pad; uses thumb typing 
slim keyboard
With touch pad - combined keyboard and touchpad

Bluetooth keyboard
A Bluetooth keyboard is a wireless keyboard that connects and communicates with its parent device via the Bluetooth protocol. These devices are widely used with such portable devices as smart phones  and tablets, though they are also used with laptops and ultrabooks. Bluetooth keyboards became popular in 2011, coincident with the popularity of portable devices.

Most bluetooth keyboards have standard qwerty layouts, though some mini Bluetooth keyboards may have a different layout. Bluetooth keyboards are compatible with all the leading operating systems such as Android, iOS, Linux, macOS, and Windows. Since they are used primarily for portable devices Bluetooth keyboards have special function keys for Android and iOS operating systems. Most bluetooth keyboards, except a few, are not compatible across operating systems, so compatibility of the keyboard needs to be checked before purchasing one; this is because of the special function keys which differ between Android and iOS.

See also
Apple Wireless Keyboard
Logitech Unifying receiver
Remote control

References

Computer keyboard types
Remote control
American inventions